John Berde may refer to:

John Berde (MP for Bath), English politician
John Berde (MP for Hythe), MP for Hythe

See also
John Bird (disambiguation)